Engelmann Stadium is a Division I soccer venue on the campus of the University of Wisconsin–Milwaukee. It is home to the Milwaukee Panthers men's and women's soccer teams, both of which compete in the Horizon League of the NCAA's Division I. Engelmann Stadium was home to the longest-running in-season tournament in NCAA Division I men's soccer, the Panther Invitational. The 40th edition of the tournament was held in 2014, and for the first time was split between Engelmann Stadium and Valley Fields on the campus of Marquette University. However, the tournament has not been held since.

Built in 1973 the 2,200-capacity field is tucked between buildings in the middle of the campus. The stadium has been renovated and fitted with new features, including the installation of a state-of-the-art lighting system and an artificial playing surface.

The soccer stadium was renamed Laura Moynihan Field at Engelmann Stadium in 2011.  Women's soccer head coach Michael Moynihan and associate head coach David Nikolic raised money to remake the playing surface to allow for practice as well as match play.  In honor of Moynihan's mother, former head coach Laura Moynihan, the field was renamed Laura Moynihan Field and the Engelmann name was attached to the stadium overall.

See also
Milwaukee Cup

References

External links 
 Information at Milwaukee Panther Athletics site

Soccer venues in Wisconsin
Milwaukee Panthers men's soccer